Keh Chong is a commune in Bar Kaev District in northeast Cambodia. It contains nine villages and has a population of 2,415. In the 2007 commune council elections, four of its seats went to the Cambodian People's Party and one went to the Sam Rainsy Party. Land alienation is a problem of moderate severity in Ke Chong. (See Ratanakiri Province for background information on land alienation.)

Villages

References

Communes of Ratanakiri province